In mathematics, the Riesz mean is a certain mean of the terms in a series. They were introduced by Marcel Riesz in 1911 as an improvement over the Cesàro mean. The Riesz mean should not be confused with the Bochner–Riesz mean or the Strong–Riesz mean.

Definition
Given a series , the Riesz mean of the series is defined by

Sometimes, a generalized Riesz mean is defined as

Typically, a sequence is summable when the limit  exists, or the limit  exists, although the precise summability theorems in question often impose additional conditions.

Special cases
Let  for all . Then

The power series

Note that the integral is of the form of an inverse Mellin transform.

Another interesting case connected with number theory arises by taking  where  is the Von Mangoldt function. Then

Again, one must take c > 1.  The sum over ρ is the sum over the zeroes of the Riemann zeta function, and

is convergent for λ > 1.

The integrals that occur here are similar to the Nörlund–Rice integral; very roughly, they can be connected to that integral via Perron's formula.

References
  M. Riesz, Comptes Rendus, 12 June 1911
  
 

Means
Summability methods
Zeta and L-functions